Post-postmodernism is a wide-ranging set of developments in critical theory, philosophy, architecture, art, literature, and culture which are emerging from and reacting to postmodernism.

Periodization
Most scholars would agree that modernism began around 1900 and continued on as the dominant cultural force in the intellectual circles of Western culture well into the mid-twentieth century. Like all eras, modernism encompasses many competing individual directions and is impossible to define as a discrete unity or totality. However, its chief general characteristics are often thought to include an emphasis on "radical aesthetics, technical experimentation, spatial or rhythmic, rather than chronological form, [and] self-conscious reflexiveness" as well as the search for authenticity in human relations, abstraction in art, and utopian striving. These characteristics are normally lacking in postmodernism or are treated as objects of irony.

Postmodernism arose after World War II as a reaction to the perceived failings of modernism, whose radical artistic projects had come to be associated with totalitarianism or had been assimilated into mainstream culture. The basic features of what we now call postmodernism can be found as early as the 1940s, most notably in the work of Jorge Luis Borges. However, most scholars today would agree that postmodernism began to compete with modernism in the late 1950s and gained ascendancy over it in the 1960s. Since then, postmodernism has been a dominant, though not undisputed, force in art, literature, film, music, drama, architecture, history, and continental philosophy. Salient features of postmodernism are normally thought to include the ironic play with styles, citations and narrative levels, a metaphysical skepticism or nihilism towards a "grand narrative" of  Western culture, a preference for the virtual at the expense of the real (or more accurately, a fundamental questioning of what 'the real' constitutes) and a "waning of affect" on the part of the subject, who is caught up in the free interplay of virtual, endlessly reproducible signs inducing a state of consciousness similar to schizophrenia.

Since the late 1990s there has been a small but growing feeling both in popular culture and in academia that postmodernism "has gone out of fashion." However, there have been few formal attempts to define and name the era succeeding postmodernism, and none of the proposed designations has yet become part of mainstream usage.

Definitions
Consensus on what constitutes an era can not be easily achieved while that era is still in its early stages. However, a common theme of current attempts to define post-postmodernism is emerging as one where faith, trust, dialogue, performance, and sincerity can work to transcend postmodern irony. The following definitions, which vary widely in depth, focus, and scope, are listed in the chronological order of their appearance.

Turner's post-postmodernism
In 1995, the landscape architect and urban planner Tom Turner issued a book-length call for a post-postmodern turn in urban planning. Turner criticizes the postmodern credo of "anything goes" and suggests that "the built environment professions are witnessing the gradual dawn of a post-Postmodernism that seeks to temper reason with faith." In particular, Turner argues for the use of timeless organic and geometrical patterns in urban planning. As sources of such patterns he cites, among others, the Taoist-influenced work of the American architect Christopher Alexander, gestalt psychology  and the psychoanalyst Carl Jung's concept of archetypes. Regarding terminology, Turner urges us to "embrace post-Postmodernism – and pray for a better name."

Epstein's trans-postmodernism
In his 1999 book on Russian postmodernism the Russian-American Slavist Mikhail Epstein suggested that postmodernism  "is ... part of a much larger historical formation," which he calls "postmodernity". Epstein believes that postmodernist aesthetics will eventually become entirely conventional and provide the foundation for a new, non-ironic kind of poetry, which he describes using the prefix "trans-":
 As an example Epstein cites the work of the contemporary Russian poet Timur Kibirov.

Gans' post-millennialism
The term post-millennialism was introduced in 2000 by the American cultural theorist Eric Gans to describe the era after postmodernism in ethical and socio-political terms. Gans associates postmodernism closely with "victimary thinking," which he defines as being based on a non-negotiable ethical opposition between perpetrators and victims arising out of the experience of Auschwitz and Hiroshima. In Gans's view, the ethics of postmodernism is derived from identifying with the peripheral victim and disdaining the utopian center occupied by the perpetrator. Postmodernism in this sense is marked by a victimary politics that is productive in its opposition to modernist utopianism and totalitarianism but unproductive in its resentment of capitalism and liberal democracy, which he sees as the long-term agents of global reconciliation. In contrast to postmodernism, post-millennialism is distinguished by the rejection of victimary thinking and a turn to "non-victimary dialogue" that will "diminish ... the amount of resentment in the world." Gans has developed the notion of post-millennialism further in many of his internet Chronicles of Love and Resentment and the term is allied closely with his theory of generative anthropology and his scenic concept of history.

Kirby's pseudo-modernism or digimodernism
In his 2006 paper The Death of Postmodernism and Beyond, the British scholar Alan Kirby formulated a socio-cultural assessment of post-postmodernism that he calls "pseudo-modernism". Kirby associates pseudo-modernism with the triteness and shallowness resulting from the instantaneous, direct, and superficial participation in culture made possible by the internet, mobile phones, interactive television and similar means: "In pseudo-modernism one phones, clicks, presses, surfs, chooses, moves, downloads."

Pseudo-modernism's "typical intellectual states" are furthermore described as being "ignorance, fanaticism and anxiety" and it is said to produce a "trance-like state" in those participating in it. The net result of this media-induced shallowness and instantaneous participation in trivial events is a "silent autism" superseding "the neurosis of modernism and the narcissism of postmodernism." Kirby sees no aesthetically valuable works coming out of "pseudo-modernism". As examples of its triteness he cites reality TV, interactive news programs, "the drivel found ... on some Wikipedia pages", docu-soaps, and the essayistic cinema of Michael Moore or Morgan Spurlock. In a book published in September 2009 titled Digimodernism: How New Technologies Dismantle the Postmodern and Reconfigure our Culture, Kirby developed further and nuanced his views on culture and textuality in the aftermath of postmodernism.

Vermeulen and van den Akker's metamodernism
In 2010 the cultural theorists Timotheus Vermeulen and Robin van den Akker introduced the term metamodernism as an intervention in the post-postmodernism debate. In their article "Notes on Metamodernism" they assert that the 2000s are characterized by the emergence of a sensibility that oscillates between, and must be situated beyond, modern positions and postmodern strategies. As examples of the metamodern sensibility Vermeulen and van den Akker cite the "informed naivety", "pragmatic idealism" and "moderate fanaticism" of the various cultural responses to, among others, climate change, the financial crisis, and (geo)political instability.

The prefix 'meta' here refers not to some reflective stance or repeated rumination, but to Plato's metaxy, which intends a movement between opposite poles as well as beyond.

Mehdi Ghasemi's hyperhybridism and heterolinationalism
In 2020 and 2022, the literary scholar Mehdi Ghasemi introduced the terms hyperhybridism and heterolinationalism in the Journal of Contemporary Aesthetics. In his article, "Post-postmodernism and the Emergence of Heterolinational Literatures," he joined the running debates on post-postmodernism through introducing "hyperhybridism and heterolinationalism" as another successors to postmodernism and drawing upon some paradigms of hyperhybrid and heterolinational literatures, including postacademia, postnationalism and polyliterature, polyvocalism and plurilingualism, self-publishing, social media and multimediality as well as transtextuality and fanfiction.

See also
 Altermodern
 Cold war
 Dogme 95
 Excessivism
 Integral theory (Ken Wilber)
 Kitsch movement
 Maximalism
 Metamodernism
 Neo-minimalism
 New Puritans
 New Sincerity
 New Urbanism
 Post-irony
 Post-truth
 Pseudorealism
 Radical orthodoxy
 Remodernism
 Stuckism
 Transmodernism

References

External links
Essay by Alan Kirby on theories of post-postmodernism
Essay by Mikhail Epstein on The Place of Postmodernism in Postmodernity
Introduction to "Digimodernism: How New Technologies Dismantle the Postmodern and Reconfigure Our Culture" by Alan Kirby
notes on metamodernism
Performatism.de (Resource site for performatism and theories of post-postmodernism)
Post-post-modernism known as Authenticism
Post-postmodern novel by Patrick J. F. Quere
Post-postmodernism known as Hyperhybridism

Theories of aesthetics
Architectural theory
Visual arts genres
Contemporary art
Postmodern theory
Critical theory
Criticism of postmodernism
Modernism
Modernist architecture
New Urbanism
Postmodernism
Postmodern architecture
21st century in the arts